"Happy Days Are Here Again" is a 1929 song with music by Milton Ager and lyrics by Jack Yellen. The song is a standard that has been interpreted by various artists.
It appeared in the 1930 film Chasing Rainbows and was the campaign song for Franklin D. Roosevelt's 1932 presidential campaign. It is the unofficial anthem of Roosevelt’s Democratic Party.

The song is number 47 on the Recording Industry Association of America's list of "Songs of the Century".
In 1986 it received an ASCAP Award for 'Most Performed Feature Film Standards on TV'.

In Chasing Rainbows 
The song was recorded by Leo Reisman and His Orchestra, with vocals by Lou Levin in November 1929 and was featured in the 1930 film Chasing Rainbows.  The song concluded the picture, in what film historian Edwin Bradley described as a "pull-out-all-the-stops Technicolor finale, against a Great War Armistice show-within-a-show backdrop".

In popular culture
Closely associated with Franklin D. Roosevelt's successful presidential campaign in 1932, the song gained prominence after a spontaneous decision by Roosevelt's advisers to play it at the 1932 Democratic National Convention: after a dirge-like version of Roosevelt's favorite song "Anchors Aweigh" had been repeated over and over, without enthusiasm, a participant reportedly shouted: "FOR GOD'S SAKE, HAVE THEM PLAY SOMETHING ELSE", which caused the band to play the new song, drawing cheers and applause, and subsequently becoming the Democratic Party's "unofficial theme song for years to come." The song is also associated with the Repeal of Prohibition, which occurred shortly after Roosevelt's election where there were signs saying "Happy days are beer again" and so on.

Matthew Greenwald described the song as "[a] true saloon standard, [and] a Tin Pan Alley standard, and had been sung by virtually every interpreter since the 1940s. In a way, it's the pop version of "Auld Lang Syne".

The song has been recorded hundreds of times, and appeared in over 80 films, including many from the 1930s.

Barbra Streisand recordings

Barbra Streisand first recorded the song over three decades after its initial release. While traditionally sung at a brisk pace, Streisand's rendition became notable for its slow and expressive performance.

On a May 1962 episode of The Garry Moore Show, Streisand sang the song during the That Wonderful Year skit representing 1929. She performed it ironically as a millionaire who has just lost all of her money and enters a bar, giving the bartender her expensive jewelry in exchange for drinks.

Streisand first recorded the song in October 1962 at Columbia's NYC studio, some months before her first album sessions. This version, arranged and conducted by George Williams, became Streisand's first commercial single in November 1962, with When the Sun Comes Out as a B-side. Only 500 copies of this single were pressed for the New York market, and no copies were sent to radio stations. This 1962 version was re-released as a single in March 1965 as part of the Hall of Fame series with the 1962 recording of My Coloring Book.

Streisand re-recorded the song in January 1963 for her debut solo The Barbra Streisand Album, including the introductory lyrics, which are rarely sung in most releases.

Streisand sang the song opposite Judy Garland, who performed Get Happy, during an October 1963 broadcast of The Judy Garland Show. (The live performance of this medley would later be included on Streisand's 1991 box set Just for the Record... and again on her 2002 Duets compilation album.)

In June 1967, Streisand performed the song for over 135,000 people at Central Park, captured on the live concert album A Happening in Central Park. (The live track later appeared on the compilations Barbra Streisand's Greatest Hits and The Essential Barbra Streisand.)

The song has become a signature part of Streisand's concert repertoire, performing it live on numerous occasions; unique renditions appear on Live Concert at the Forum (1972), One Voice (1987), The Concert (1994), Timeless: Live in Concert (2000), Live in Concert 2006 (2007), Back to Brooklyn (2013), and The Music...The Mem'ries...The Magic! (2017).

Streisand released a new studio recording of "Happy Days" on her 2018 album Walls.

Other versions
Annette Hanshaw recorded it in 1930. with Ben Selvin and his Orchestra.
 In 1930, the Comedian Harmonists recorded their popular German adaptation, Wochenend und Sonnenschein (Weekend and Sunshine, German lyrics by Charles Amberg).
 The song was sung by prisoners in an ironic comic version in 20,000 Years in Sing Sing (1932).
 Television and nightclub comedian Rip Taylor used "Happy Days Are Here Again" for years as his theme song; the music played as he made his entrance carrying a large bag of confetti throwing handfuls at everyone within reach.
 The song was also used as the entrance and closing theme for comedian Mark Russell's PBS specials that aired from 1975–2004 and featured topical political humor.
 A recording of the song by Mitch Miller and the Gang was used as the theme for the PBS sports history series The Way It Was in the 1970s.
 The television show M*A*S*H used an Asian-influenced orchestration of the song on multiple episodes early in the series, in which the female vocalist would sing the verses in Japanese while singing the title in English.
 The song was used as a jingle in TV commercials for the Volkswagen Rabbit economy family car in 1975.
 A rousing rendition of the tune often accompanied the arrival of recurring character Lady Constance de Coverlet in the radio show I'm Sorry, I'll Read That Again.
 Miss New York 1983 Vanessa Williams performed the song during the talent competition of the Miss America 1984 pageant. Williams went on to win both a preliminary talent award and was crowned Miss America 1984.
 Vicki Lawrence sang the song while portraying Thelma Harper in the Mama's Family episode "Mama for Mayor: Part 1".
 The Ovaltineys cover of the song was featured in the 1981 miniseries Goliath Awaits.
 The Blue Devils Drum and Bugle Corps of Concord, CA used the song to open their 1988 Program and was used again in 2009 as part of their program entitled "1930".
 The song was used as the theme tune by Lotto during 1989.
The cast of Amen performed the song, with Jester Hairston and Roz Ryan singing solos as their respective characters, Rolly Forbes and Amelia Heterbrink.
Walter  Strony  used the song to open his concert at Chicago  Stadium  for the 1993 ATOS National Convention
 The medley version paired with "Get Happy", evoking the 1963 duet by Barbra Streisand and Judy Garland, was performed in 2010 by Lea Michele (as Rachel Berry) and Chris Colfer (as Kurt Hummel) for the "Duets" episode of the second season of Glee.
 In 2010, Carrie Fisher sang the song at the beginning of her HBO special, Wishful Drinking.
 A harmonica rendition was played early in the Christmas-themed pilot episode of The Waltons, entitled "The Homecoming", by one of the Walton children until John Boy requested something more Christmas-y.
 In July 2013, a rock and roll version of the song was used by Fox in a commercial ad campaign to introduce a new sports channel called Fox Sports 1.
 The song was used for the closing credits in Boardwalk Empire season 5, episode 3 "What Jesus Said".
 In 2014, actress Jessica Lange provided a speaking version of the song that was played in the background throughout designer Marc Jacobs' Fall/Winter runway show.
 The song was featured in the opening scene of the first episode of the 2015 PBS Masterpiece drama series Indian Summers, which is set in India in the summer of 1932.
 A shortened version with different lyrics was featured in Beautiful: The Carole King Musical from 2014.
 The song was used for the closing credits in The Last Tycoon Season 1, Episode 9.
 The song was used in Season 1, Episode 4 of The Marvelous Mrs. Maisel.
 Spanish singer Aitana performed the song at the 35th Goya Awards ceremony.
 It is frequently featured during Philadelphia's annual Mummer's Parade, played by the Ferko String Band and other bands. 
 The song is sung in the 1964 film The Night of the Iguana by the women in the tour group on the bus as Richard Burton's character roils in sweat, loathing each moment.

References

1929 songs
1930 singles
Whispering Jack Smith songs
Songs written by Jack Yellen
Songs with music by Milton Ager
Songs written for films
Great Depression songs
Political party songs
Democratic Party (United States)